The 2001 Notre Dame Fighting Irish football team represented the University of Notre Dame in the 2001 NCAA Division I-A football season. The team was coached by Bob Davie and played its home games at Notre Dame Stadium in South Bend, Indiana.

Season overview
With 19 recruits signed to help replace the nine players leaving for the NFL, there were high expectations for the Irish for the 2001 season. Three players were named to pre-season All-America teams while the team was ranked as highly as 12th in the nation. With former starting quarterback, Arnaz Battle, moving in the off-season to wide receiver, Davie faced the decision of having to play his replacement from 2000, Matt LoVecchio, or to replace LoVecchio with fellow sophomore Carlyle Holiday. Prior to their first game, Davie hinted that he might have a surprise at quarterback, however, LoVecchio started at the fourth-ranked Nebraska Cornhuskers. Notre Dame's first play from scrimmage proved to be a harbinger when the Irish fumbled and Nebraska recovered. With LoVecchio ineffective throughout the first quarter, Holiday took over and led the Irish to a field goal. Holiday, however, was ineffective throughout the rest of the game and the only other Irish score came after Shane Walton blocked a punt and gave the Irish the ball on the 4 yard line. Unable to capitalize on Nebraska's mistakes, and having four turnovers themselves, the Irish lost the game 27–10. With a small quarterback controversy, the season was interrupted by the September 11, 2001 attacks. With all Division I-A football games canceled after the attacks, the September 15 game against Purdue was moved to the end of the season. With promises of heightened security, prayers, and a stadium-wide fundraiser to help the victims of the attacks, the Irish returned to the field the next week to face the Michigan State Spartans. With LoVecchio getting the start, he had a better game than his first, but the Irish fell short of the Spartans for the fifth straight year.

After the loss, Davie named Holiday the starting quarterback for the Texas A&M game. Though LoVecchio would play in later games, he would never start again for the Irish and eventually transferred from the school. Playing in front of, at the time, the largest crowd ever to watch a football game in Texas, Holiday was knocked out of the game with a neck injury before halftime. The Irish were unable move the ball and lost 24–3, moving to 0–3 for the first time ever. With Holiday back the next week, he led the Irish to their first victory of the season against the Pittsburgh Panthers, and continued to roll with wins over West Virginia and USC to put the Irish back to a 3–3 record. With a loss the next week to Boston College, however, the Irish hopes for a bowl game were dwindling and all but gone with a loss the next week to the seventh-ranked Tennessee Volunteers.

With a 3–5 record, the Irish would need to win all of their remaining games to avoid Davie's second losing season for the team. The Irish looked to turn it around with a dominating win over Navy that increased their record winning streak over them to 38 games, however, fell to Stanford the next week after both Holiday and LoVecchio completed only one pass each the entire game. Assured of Notre Dame's eighth losing season ever, the Irish traveled to face the Purdue Boilermakers for the game missed after the September 11 attacks. Though the Irish defense helped secure the win and the 5–6 record, it wasn't enough for the Notre Dame administration who fired Davie the next day.

Schedule

Roster

Team players in the NFL

References

Notre Dame
Notre Dame Fighting Irish football seasons
Notre Dame Fighting Irish football